Hellmann is a German surname. Notable people with the surname include:

 Claudia Hellmann (1923–2017), German contralto
 Ernesto Hellmann (1898–1952), Italian chess player
 Diethard Hellmann (1928–1999), German choral conductor and academic
 Gustav Hellmann (1854–1939), German meteorologist
 Hans Hellmann (1903–1938), German theoretical chemist
 Hellmann–Feynman theorem
 Libby Fischer Hellmann (born 1949), crime fiction writer
 Martina Hellmann (born 1960), German athlete
 Richard Hellmann (1876-1971), German-American businessman and company founder of Hellmanns
 William K. Hellmann, former Secretary of the Maryland Department of Transportation (1984–1987)

See also 
 Hellmann Worldwide Logistics
 Hellmann's and Best Foods
 Hellman
 Helmand Province, Afghanistan

German-language surnames